Mayerhofer or Mayerhöfer is a German language habitational surname. Notable people with the name include:
 Christian Mayerhöfer (1971), German former field hockey player
 Elfie Mayerhofer (1917–1992), Austrian film actress and singer
 Veronika Mayerhofer (1992), Austrian cross-country skier

References 

German-language surnames
German toponymic surnames